Phaio cephalena is a moth of the subfamily Arctiinae. It was described by Druce in 1883. It is found in Colombia and Ecuador.

References

Arctiinae
Moths described in 1883